Alessandro Centurione (died 1605) was a Roman Catholic prelate who served as Archbishop of Genoa (1591–1596).

Biography
Alessandro Centurione was born in Genoa, Italy.
On 9 August 1591, he was appointed during the papacy of Pope Gregory XIV as Archbishop of Genoa.
On 22 September 1591, he was consecrated bishop by Antonmaria Sauli, Cardinal-Priest of Santo Stefano al Monte Celio, with Domenico Grimaldi, Archbishop of Avignon, and Francesco Cornaro (iuniore), Bishop of Treviso, serving as co-consecrators.
He served as Archbishop of Genoa until his resignation in 1596.
He died in Ravenna, Italy in 1605.

While bishop, he was the principal co-consecrator of Archbishop Juan Santisteban de Falces, Archbishop of Brindisi (1605).

References

External links and additional sources
 (for Chronology of Bishops) 
 (for Chronology of Bishops) 
 (for Chronology of Bishops) 

16th-century Italian Roman Catholic bishops
Bishops appointed by Pope Gregory XIV
1605 deaths